Khattar is a surname found among the Aroras and Jats of India and Pakistan.

References

Punjabi tribes
Indian surnames
Surnames of Indian origin
Punjabi-language surnames
Hindu surnames
Khatri clans
Khatri surnames
Jat clans of Punjab
Jat clans of Pakistan